Weiler (German for village or hamlet) may refer to:

Places
 Weiler, Austria, a town in Vorarlberg in Austria
 Weiler, Luxembourg, a hamlet in Luxembourg
 Villerupt, France (in German and Luxemburgish: Weiler), a town in France
 in Germany 
Weiler, Cochem-Zell, in the district Cochem-Zell, Rhineland-Palatinate
Weiler, Mayen-Koblenz, in the district Mayen-Koblenz, Rhineland-Palatinate
Weiler bei Bingen, in the district Mainz-Bingen, Rhineland-Palatinate
Weiler bei Monzingen, in the district of Bad Kreuznach, Rhineland-Palatinate
Weiler (Rottenburg), a suburb of Rottenburg am Neckar in the district of Tübingen, Baden-Württemberg
Weiler-Simmerberg, a town in Lindau district, Bavaria; incorporates the former town Weiler im Allgäu
Dudweiler, part of Saarbrücken

People
Albert Weiler (born 1965), German politician
Barbara Weiler (born 1946), German politician
Dirk Weiler, German musical theatre actor living in the United States
Jack D. Weiler (1904-1995), American real estate developer and philanthropist
Joseph H. H. Weiler, (born 1951), professor at New York University Law School
Lance Weiler, American film-maker and writer
Lucien Weiler (born 1951), Luxembourgian politician and jurist
Max Weiler (1900–1969), Swiss footballer
Raoul Weiler (1938–2019), President of the EU-Chapter of The Club of Rome
René Weiler (born 1973), Swiss footballer
Sepp Weiler (1921–1997), German ski jumper
Sophie von Weiler (born 1958), Dutch field hockey forward in the olympics
Wayne Weiler (1934–2005), American racecar driver
Paul C. Weiler (1939–2021) Harvard law professor and supporter of non obstante clause in Canada's constitution

See also 
 Wyler (disambiguation)
 Wheeler (disambiguation)